Nule is a comune (municipality) in the Province of Sassari in the Italian region Sardinia, located about  north of Cagliari and about  southeast of Sassari. 

Nule borders the following municipalities: Benetutti, Bitti, Orune, Osidda, Pattada.

References

Cities and towns in Sardinia